Made in Thailand e-Sports (MiTH) is a professional esports organization based in Thailand. It was founded in 2012 by Chanignun Thipairote.

History 
The beginning of the organization came from the event that Chanignun Thipairote had seen the E-Sports of other countries, and they were better than Thailand. Then he decided to make a team. The first team that joined MiTh was MiTh. GC (GlamoRous Crazy), which was the Point Bank champion of Thailand at that time and win the PBIC tournament in 2011. After that, the organization grew and a lot of sponsors supported them. The organization is sponsored by NVIDIA, BenQ, MSi, G2a.com, SteelSeries and OCZ Stotrage Solutions. The organization now have MiTH.Hybrid for Hero of Newerth, MiTh.HEROES for Heroes of the Storm, MiTH.GlamoRousCrazy for Point Bank, Mith CS:GO for Counter-Strike: Global Offensive, MiTH.tAf for Special Force 2. MiTh also have the individual players for Fifa Online 3 and Starcraft II.

Honours
This is a list of honours for the Made in Thailand E-sport

MiTH.OHP
1st HoN HoT Tournament 2011
1st HoN Fire Inferno Tournament 2011
1st ASRock HoN Tournament Season 1
1st ASRock HoN Tournament Season 2
1st DreamHoN 2012: Thailand Qualifier
1st HoN Rookie Cup 2012
1st HoN Thai 2 DreamHack Tournament
2nd Garena HoN Championships Season#1 2011
2nd G-League – March 2013
3rd HoN THUNDER EDGE TOURNAMENT
3rd HoN Thai 2 DreamHack Tournament BIG Festival 2012
7th Garena HON Star League 2012

MiTH.s2y 
1st HoN Tour Grand Final 2013 (แชมป์ประเทศไทย)
1st HoN SEA Tournament Circle 2
1st HoN SEA Dreamhack Qualify to Sweden (แชมป์ SEA)
1st HoN SEA Tournament Grandfinal 2014
1st HoN World Tour 2014 at GSL 2014 Bitec Bangna
1st HoN Road To DreamHack Summer 2013 (ได้สิทธิ์ตัวแทนประเทศไทย)
2nd HoN Bangkok Tournament 2012
2nd HoN G-League เดือน พฤษภาคม 2013 
3rd HoN G-League เดือน กุมภาพันธ์ 2013
3rd HoN G-League เดือน มีนาคม 2013
3rd HoN Garena Star League 2013
5th HoN Dreamhack (Sweden)
5th HoN Tour World Final @Garena Star League 2014

Counter-Strike : Global Offensive
This is a list of Achievement 2014-2016
1st GIGABYTE CS:GO Tournament #1
1st BenQ CS:GO Championship 2014
1st CS:GO UNITRY PRE-SEASON 2014
1st BenQ CS:GO XL Series Tournament January 2015
1st SteelSeries CS:GO Tournament
1st EXL CS:GO Tournament ภาคใต้
1st CS:GO EXL 2015 : Grand Final (LAN Event Thailand Championship 2015)
1st Thailand represent to AGES 2016 Malaysia (LAN Event)
1st Sports Illustrated eSports CS:GO INVITATION CUP (LAN Event)
1st eXTREMESLAND ZOWIE Asia CS:GO 2016 (Thailand qualify LAN Event)
2nd CS:GO Pre-Season 2014
2nd CS:GO Twin Frag Tournament LAN by BenQ & SteelSeries
2nd Zowie CS:GO Challenge#1
2nd AGES 2016 Lan Grand Final (LAN Event @Malaysia)
2nd WirForce CSGO LAN Party 2016 (LAN Event @Chinese Taipei)
Achievement 2017
1st ZOWIE CS:GO Challenge#7 (LAN)
1st 9th Esport 2017 World Championship Qualifier (LAN)
[ได้สิทธิ์เป็นตัวแทนทีมชาติไทยไปต่องาน IeSF + Predator Helios 300 มูลค่า 49,990 บาท]
4th FPSThailand x SteelSeries Pro League by Twitch Season #1

MiTH.Flashdive
1st : League of Legends Thailand Grand Final 2013
1st : League of Legends Thailand Championship Series : Pro League 2 
1st : League of Legends Folk League Tournament #1 By Gview
1st : League of Legends Road to WCG 2013
2nd : League of Legends Thailand Championship Series : Road To World Season 3
2nd : LoL Pro league Winter Season 2014
2nd : LoL Pro League Spring Season 2014
3rd : LoL Pro League 2014 – Summer Season
4th : League of Legends Thailand Grand Final 2014

References

External links 
 

Esports teams based in Thailand
Counter-Strike teams
StarCraft teams
FIFA (video game series) teams
World of Tanks teams
Heroes of Newerth teams
Heroes of the Storm teams
Defunct and inactive League of Legends teams
Esports teams established in 2012